You May Be Next is a 1936 American crime film directed by Albert S. Rogell and starring Ann Sothern, Lloyd Nolan and Douglass Dumbrille.

The film's sets were designed by the art director Stephen Goosson.

Cast
 Ann Sothern as Fay Stevens  
 Lloyd Nolan as Neil Bennett  
 Douglass Dumbrille as Beau Gardner 
 John Arledge as Eddie House 
 Berton Churchill as J.J. Held  
 Nana Bryant as Miss Abbott  
 Robert Middlemass as Dan McMahon  
 George McKay as Mitch Cook  
 Gene Morgan as Ted Lene  
 Clyde Dilson as Nick Barrow

References

Bibliography
 Michael Schlossheimer. Gunmen and Gangsters: Profiles of Nine Actors Who Portrayed Memorable Screen Tough Guys. McFarland, 2001.

External links
 

1936 films
1936 crime films
1930s English-language films
American crime films
Films directed by Albert S. Rogell
Columbia Pictures films
American black-and-white films
1930s American films